The Run to the Tower is a 12-kilometer (7.456 miles) run from the front gate of Camp Darby to the Leaning Tower of Pisa which takes place annually in Italy.

References 
http://www.aviano.af.mil/shared/media/document/AFD-071101-053.pdf
http://www.usag.livorno.army.mil/sites/PhotosRunToTheTower.html 
http://www.usag.livorno.army.mil/sites/PhotosRunToTheTower2007.html

Long-distance running competitions
Athletics competitions in Italy
Sport in Pisa